Sartekeh, also rendered as Sardekeh, may refer to:
 Sartekeh-ye Olya
 Sartekeh-ye Sofla